The 2021 European Beach Volleyball Championships is a 2021 edition of European Beach Volleyball Championship which is a unisex competition of national teams which took place from 11 to 15 August 2021 in Vienna in Austria. The draw consisted of 32 men's & 32 women's teams.

Medal events

Medal table

Medal summary

Men's tournament

Preliminary round

Pool A

|}

Pool B

|}

Pool C

|}

Pool D

|}

Pool E

|}

Pool F

|}

Pool G

|}

Pool H

|}

Knockout stage

Round of 24

|}

Round of 16

|}

Quarterfinals

|}

Semifinals

|}

Third place game

|}

Final

|}

Women's tournament

Preliminary round

Pool A

|}

Pool B

|}

Pool C

|}

Pool D

|}

Pool E

|}

Pool F

|}

Pool G

|}

Pool H

|}

Knockout stage

Round of 24

|}

Round of 16

|}

Quarterfinals

|}

Semifinals

|}

Third place game

|}

Final

|}

References

External links
Men's tournament – Results
Women's tournament – Results

European Beach Volleyball Championships
European Beach Volleyball
European Beach Volleyball
European Beach Volleyball Championships
International volleyball competitions hosted by Austria
2021 European Beach Volleyball